The Naked Maja is a 1958 Italian-American co-production made by S.G.C., Titanus, and United Artists. This historical film recounting of the romance between the painter Francisco Goya and the Duchess of Alba was directed by Henry Koster, and produced by Silvio Clementelli and Goffredo Lombardo. The screenplay was by Norman Corwin, Giorgio Prosperi and Albert Lewin based on a story by Oscar Saul and Talbot Jennings. The music score was by Angelo Lavagnino and the cinematography by Giuseppe Rotunno.

The film stars Ava Gardner and Anthony Franciosa with Amedeo Nazzari, Gino Cervi, Lea Padovani, Massimo Serato, and a largely Italian cast. It is based on a novel by Noel Gerson.

Cast 
Partial list of actors:
 Ava Gardner as Maria Teresa de Cayetana, Duchess of Alba	 
 Anthony Franciosa as Francisco Goya y Lucientes
 Amedeo Nazzari as Manuel Godoy
 Gino Cervi as King Carlos IV  	 
 Lea Padovani as Queen Maria Luisa
 Massimo Serato as Rodrigo Sanchez  	 
 Renzo Cesana as Bayeu
 Carlo Giustini as José
 Carlo Rizzo as Juanito

Box office 
According to MGM records the film earned $1 million at the box office outside the US and Canada resulting in a loss to the studio of $513,000.

See also 
 List of American films of 1958

References

External links 
 

1958 films
1950s historical films
1950s English-language films
English-language Italian films
American historical films
Italian historical films
American biographical films
Titanus films
Films directed by Henry Koster
Biographical films about painters
Cultural depictions of Francisco Goya
Films set in the 1790s
Films set in the 1800s
Films set in Madrid
Italian biographical films
Films scored by Angelo Francesco Lavagnino
1950s American films
1950s Italian films